Acestridium triplax is a species of armored catfish in the genus Acestridium. It is native to the Amazon River in Brazil.

References

Fish of Brazil
Hypoptopomatini